is a metro station on the Osaka Metro Tanimachi Line in Abeno-ku, Osaka, Japan.  Trains starting from Fuminosato bound for Miyakojima and Dainichi also run.

While situated relatively close to Showacho on the Midosuji Line, there is no free transfer between the two stations.

Layout
This station has an island platform serving two tracks on the second basement.

Establishments around the station
Fuminosato Shopping Arcade
Okazakiya
Momogaike Park

External links

 Official Site 
 Official Site 

Abeno-ku, Osaka
Railway stations in Osaka
Railway stations in Japan opened in 1980
Osaka Metro stations